Synemon discalis, the small orange-spotted sun-moth,  is a moth in the Castniidae family. It is found in Australia, including South Australia, Western Australia and Victoria.

The wingspan is about 31 mm for males and 35 mm for females. Adults have a series of prominent bright orange spots on the black uppersides of the hindwing.

Adults are on wing from late October to mid November

The larvae feed on Gahnia lanigera and Lepidosperma carphoides. In the early stages, the species is subterranean. It has a life cycle that possibly takes two to three years to complete.

References

Moths described in 1911
Castniidae